"Here I Go Again" is a song by Whitesnake.

Here I Go Again may also refer to:

Here I Go Again (album), by The Hollies
Here I Go Again (EP), by The Hollies
"Here I Go Again" (E-Type song)
"Here I Go Again" (Glenn Jones song)
"Here I Go Again" (Larry Evoy song)
"Here I Go Again" (Mario song)
"Here I Go Again" (The Miracles song)
"Here I Go Again" (The Hollies song)
"Here I Go Again" (Legends of Tomorrow), the 11th episode in season 3 of the CW series Legends of Tomorrow
"Here I Go Again", song by Country Joe and the Fish from Here We Are Again
"Here I Go Again", song by Casting Crowns from Casting Crowns
"Here I Go Again", song by Kim Richey from My Heart
"Here I Go Again", song by Rihanna from Music of the Sun
"Here I Go Again", song by Thin Lizzy, b-side of "The Rocker"
"Here I Go Again", song by Archie Bell & the Drells from There's Gonna Be a Showdown
"Here I Go Again", a song by Luba & Curtis King Jr.

See also
Here We Go Again (disambiguation)
"Here I Go Impossible Again", a song by Erasure
Here I Go (disambiguation)
There I Go Again, album by David Meece